Rui Manuel Pinto dos Reis da Quinta (born 6 June 1960) is a Portuguese  football manager and former player. He is currently the assistant manager of Campeonato Brasileiro Série A club Flamengo.

Career
In July 2008, after several seasons working as a part of a backroom staff as well as for several lower level sides, Quinta accepted an invitation to manage Portuguese Second Division side F.C. Penafiel. At the helm of the Penafidelenses, he guided them to promotion to the Segunda Liga.

Immediately afterwards, Quinta left for Gil Vicente FC. He resigned on 28 February 2010.

On 13 June 2011, Quinta was appointed as the new manager of Varzim SC. A month into his spell, he left to take up an assistant manager role at FC Porto alongside Vítor Pereira. The club claimed back-to-back league titles.

Quinta left the Dragões at the end of the 2012–13 season, following Pereira. After a one-year absence, he returned to manage his former side Penafiel for a second spell in September 2014, this time in the Primeira Liga. He left on 17 March 2015 after a 2–0 home loss to Rio Ave F.C. left the club in last place with 16 points.

On 24 December 2016, Quinta returned to management at F.C. Vizela until the end of the season, after Ricardo Soares left for G.D. Chaves. He left the following 14 March, having won twice in 11 matches and with the team in the relegation places.

Quinta resumed his career at S.C. Espinho of the third tier on 27 June 2017. In his second season, the team won their group, but were eliminated on penalties in the quarter-finals of the promotion play-offs by eventual champions Casa Pia AC. He remained in the division and the Aveiro District, taking over at Lusitânia F.C. on 10 June 2019.

Quinta left Lusitânia by mutual consent on 9 November 2020, after four games of the new season. The following 21 January, he was hired at S.C. Salgueiros.

References

External links 
 Player and coach profile at Zerozero
 Profile & stats at ForaDeJogo

1960 births
Living people
People from Barcelos, Portugal
Portuguese footballers
Association football midfielders
Segunda Divisão players
Rebordosa A.C. players
U.S.C. Paredes players
F.C. Paços de Ferreira players
Portuguese football managers
Primeira Liga managers
Liga Portugal 2 managers
U.S.C. Paredes managers
F.C. Penafiel managers
Gil Vicente F.C. managers
S.C. Salgueiros managers
F.C. Vizela managers
Sportspeople from Braga District